Easts may refer to:
Sydney Roosters, an Australian rugby league football team in the NRL, formerly known as "Eastern Suburbs" or "Easts" for short.
Eastern Suburbs Tigers, an Australian rugby league football club
Eastern Suburbs AFC, a New Zealand Association Football (soccer) club
Easts Tigers Rugby Union, a rugby union club in Brisbane, Queensland, Australia

See also
Eastern Suburbs (disambiguation)